Sarasota may stand for:

 Sarasota, Florida
 Sarasota County, Florida 
 Sarasota Bay